CCS64 is a shareware Commodore 64 emulator developed by Per Håkan Sundell of Sweden.  It is an accurate and very popular Commodore 64 emulator which can play Commodore 64 formatted cartridges, demos, games, and music in Windows, and it has many modern software features. The emulator has had continuous enhancement and bug-fixing since its original development back in 1995.  Later versions of the emulator are fully functional, even when it is not registered.

In release 3.9.3 the message 'Jesus Christ be praised!' is visible in the 'About' window.

See also
 VICE, Open source Commodore 8-bit emulator (including VIC-20, C64, C128 etc.)

References
 Chris Kohler, Retro Gaming Hacks, O'Reilly Media, 2006, p. 262.

External links
 

Commodore 64 emulators